Treasure of the Petrified Forest (original title: Il tesoro della foresta pietrificata) is a 1965 Italian adventure film directed by .

It mixes elements of the Nibelungen saga and of Richard Wagner's opera Ring of the Nibelung, which is also used as soundtrack (especially the famous Ride of the Valkyries).

Plot
The god Wotan gives the young Prince Sigmund of Valhalla and his sister Brunhilde, the leader of the Valkyries, the task of defend the Petrified Forest. This is threatened by the Vikings, led by the aggressive Hunding, who plans an invasion of the forest, in search of the secret , the possession of which prospects unlimited power.

After crossing the border and invading Valhalla, Hunding finds an ally in the daughter of one of Sigmund's loyal followers, Erika, who is embittered by unrequited love. With her help the Vikings raid the camp of the Walhalla residents and kill many warriors. Sigmund swears vengeance and pursues them with the remaining men. However, thanks to other traitors in Sigmund's ranks, Hunding succeeds in capturing him and his fiancée Siglinde, Erika's sister. At the end, Sigmund escapes and, with the help of the Valkiries, succeeds in stopping the invaders and defeating Hunding in a duel.

Cast
 Gordon Mitchell as 
 Ivica Pajer (as Ivo Payer) as Sigmund
  as Siglinde
 Pamela Tudor as Brunhild
 Amedeo Trilli (credited as Mike Moore) as Gunar
 Luigi Tosi (credited as Nat Koster) as Otto
  (credited as Puccio Ceccarelli) as Hans
 Franco Doria as the dwarf Kurt
  as Fredrik
 Franco Beltramme as Manfred
 Lella Cattaneo as a witch
 Lia Giordano as a viking woman
 Giorgio Tesei as Olaf
  (credited as Ivan Scratuglia) as a viking warrior
 Luisa Rivelli as Erika
  as Wotan

See also
 Die Walküre by Richard Wagner

External links
 
Il tesoro della foresta pietrificata at 

1965 films
1960s fantasy adventure films
Italian fantasy adventure films
Peplum films
1960s Italian-language films
Films based on Norse mythology
Sword and sorcery films
Sword and sandal films
1960s Italian films